Jackson Pugh (born 3 February 2000) is an Australian rugby union player who plays for the  in Super Rugby. His playing position is lock. He was named in the Force squad for the 2022 Super Rugby Pacific season. He is playing Number 8 for Auckland in the 2022 season of the Bunnings NPC.

Reference list

External links
itsrugby.co.uk profile

2000 births
Australian rugby union players
Living people
Rugby union locks
Western Force players
Rugby union players from Perth, Western Australia
Auckland rugby union players